The Howard Jones Memorial Foundation is a Los Angeles-based athletic foundation dedicated to the memory of Howard Jones, the USC Trojans football coach from 1925 to 1940.

The foundation made college football national championship selections starting in 1962 and awarded the Howard Jones Memorial Trophy to their national champion. The award was voted upon by Los Angeles Press Club sportswriters.

Howard Jones Memorial Trophy

National champions

References

Sports foundations based in the United States
1962 establishments in the United States